The 1942 Nevada Wolf Pack football team was an American football team that represented the University of Nevada as an independent during the 1942 college football season. In their fourth season under head coach Jim Aiken, the team compiled a 4–3–1 record.

Marion Motley, who was later inducted into the Pro Football Hall of Fame, played for the Wolf Pack from 1941 to 1943.

Schedule

References

Nevada
Nevada Wolf Pack football seasons
Nevada Wolf Pack football